Kế Sách is a rural district of Sóc Trăng province in the Mekong River Delta region of Vietnam. As of 2003 the district had a population of 161,644. The district covers an area of 408 km². The district capital lies at Kế Sách.

References

Districts of Sóc Trăng province